Samsung Blue Earth, also known as Samsung S7550, or Samsung GT-S7550 (European model) is a touchscreen phone made from recycled plastic culled from plastic water bottles. It was announced on 13 February 2009. The unit has a solar panel on the back, covering 80% of the area. An hour of charging under sunlight can provide 10 minutes of talking on 3G networks or 2 hours in standby. A conventional rechargeable battery is also provided.

References

Samsung mobile phones
Solar-powered mobile phones
Mobile phones introduced in 2009